Bromus madritensis is a species of brome grass known by the common name compact brome. The specific epithet madritensis refers to Madrid, Spain. It has a diploid number of 28.

There are two subspecies:
Bromus madritensis subsp. madritensis: panicles less dense, stem and leaf sheath less hairy
Bromus madritensis subsp. rubens (syn. Bromus rubens) – foxtail brome, foxtail chess, red brome: dense panicles and slightly hairy stems

Description

The leaf sheaths are downy or slightly hairy. The branches never droop and bear one or two spikelets each. The spikelets vary in color from green to distinctly purplish-red. The lightly hairy glumes taper at their ends and have translucent margins. The lemmas are hairier towards their edges and have five to seven veins.

The grass emerges in early winter and remains dormant until spring when heavy rainfall and higher temperatures stimulate growth. Plants flower from this period typically until May when water stress inhibits the grass. Populations grow during periods of heavy rainfall and populations can be wiped out during extended periods of drought.

The grass alters soil conditions and the competition brought about by the grass both negatively affect native plant populations, and the highly flammable nature of the grass produces wildfires in North American communities where fire was previously rare. Dry florets of the weed entangle themselves in animal hair and can tear at the digestive tracts of foraging livestock.

Habitat and distribution

Bromus madritensis is native to southern and western Europe but has been introduced and naturalized nearly worldwide. In North America it is found primarily in the western United States, in Oregon, California, and Arizona. The grass was brought to North America in 1848 and was naturalized by the 1890s.

In its native range the grass grows in cultivated fields and steppes, and in North America it grows in waste areas, road verges, and disturbed areas, in both ranges primarily on dry stony or sandy soil. In California, the weedy grass occurs in areas disturbed by wildfires.

References

External links

Photos: ssp. rubens

madritensis
Flora of Europe
Plants described in 1759
Taxa named by Carl Linnaeus